Michael Cote may refer to:

Michael R. Cote, American businessman
Michael Richard Cote (born 1949), American bishop

See also
Michel Cote (disambiguation)